The Miracle Song (Spanish:La canción del milagro) is a 1940 Mexican film. It stars Carlos Orellana.

External links
 

1940 films
1940s Spanish-language films
Mexican black-and-white films
Mexican musical drama films
1940s musical drama films
1940 drama films
1940s Mexican films